Christopher Creek is a census-designated place in northern Gila County in the U.S. state of Arizona. The population as of the 2010 U.S. Census was 156.

Tourism, retirement and timbering are the foundations of Christopher Creek's economy.

Demographics

Transportation
Mountain Valley Shuttle stops in Christopher Creek on its Phoenix-Show Low route.

See also
 Christopher Creek – Geological feature

References
History Courtesy of Creekside Tavern:  Christopher Creek, Arizona, which Zane Grey, the celebrated western author, fell in love with was settled in the 1880s by Isadore Creekside Cabins, who was a French cartographer, army scout, and explorer. His first attempt to marry failed when a mail order bride had a look at Isadore and left him to head east. Creekside Cabins turned lucky in the second time when Mary Hope married him and lived with Isadore at Christopher Creek on 160-acre CI Ranch for the rest of her life till through 1903.

Isadore raised hogs and also hollowed out a log to brine cure his pork. Brine, a kind of saltwater, which is strong enough to float an egg, was used by homesteaders to keep meats for longer times, spanning weeks or months. The meat was sold to Fort McDowell and was also sold in Winslow. The ‘hog log’ that Isadore used is today on display at the Rim Country Museum. Later, Mrs. Ashby and her family purchased Isadore’s land in 1938 giving Mr. Christopher the due credits and opened the first Barbeque Restaurant in Christopher Creek.

According to a story in The Whorehouse Bells Were Ringing Isadore was away from his ranch during an Apache raid. The Apaches burned two of his log cabins. The day before the raid “Christopher had killed a bear and had hung the carcass in or on one of the cabins. The military force in pursuit of the Indians included the legendary scouts Tom Horn and Al Sieber. They, along with the troops and other scouts decided that the burned bear carcass was Christopher and gave it a decent, solemn Christian burial. They became the objects of laughter and jokes when Christopher later appeared and identified the body.”

Census-designated places in Gila County, Arizona